Forecourt may refer to:
 a courtyard at the front of a building
 in racket sports, the front part of the court
 the area in a filling station containing the fuel pumps
 chamber tomb forecourt, Stone Age architectural element

See also
 Forecourt Fountain, former name of Keller Fountain, Portland, Oregon, United States
 Forecourt Piers, 123 Mortlake High Street, Richmond upon Thames, United Kingdom